Serhat Teoman (born 4 June 1983) is a Turkish actor.

Life and career 
Teoman is a graduate of Dokuz Eylül University School of Fine Arts with a degree in performing arts studies. He received his master's degree in theatre studies from Mimar Sinan University. He started his career on television in early 2000s. While continuing to appear on stage, he was cast in several TV series. In 2012, a breakthrough in his career came with his role in the popular series Kuzey Güney, in which he portrayed the character of Burak Çatalcalı. Teoman continued his career with a leading role in Acil Aşk Aranıyor as Dr. Sinan and then appeared in Kaçın Kurası series as Barış. In 2017, he was cast in a recurring role in the TV series Anne. During the years 2018-2019, Serhat Teoman played in the TV series Kızım with Buğra Gülsoy and Tugay Mercan. In 2020, he had a leading role in the TV series Çocuk.

Aside from his career in television, he was a member of Tiyatro Kutu together with Buğra Gülsoy, Fatih Sönmez and Emre Erkan. After Tiyatro Kutu's dissolution, Teoman and Emre Erkan founded GET Production.

Filmography

Television

Short film 
 Randevu
 Aşkın Dört Kuralı
 Tutulma
 Son Karar

Theatre 
 Pragma 2012/GET
 Dorian Gray 2012/Tiyatro Kutu
 Ceaser Bir Denge Oyunu 2009–2010/Tiyatro Kutu
 Dalga 2007–2008/Donkişot Theatre

Awards 

 Marmara University School of Communications - 9th Short Film Contest / Best Actor
 Galatasaray University Communications Club - Sinepark Short Film Festival / Best Actor

References

External links
 
 

Living people
1983 births
Actors from İzmir
Dokuz Eylül University alumni
Turkish Muslims
Turkish male television actors
Turkish male stage actors
Turkish male film actors
21st-century Turkish male actors